Björn Palmqvist (also Palmquist, born 15 March 1944) is a Swedish former professional ice hockey player. He played with Djurgårdens IF Hockey from 1966 to 1978.

He finished fourth with the Sweden men's national ice hockey team at the 1968 and the 1972 Winter Olympics. He scored five goals in 1972 and none in 1968.

References

External links

1944 births
Living people
Djurgårdens IF Hockey players
Swedish ice hockey centres
People from Örnsköldsvik Municipality
Olympic ice hockey players of Sweden
Ice hockey players at the 1968 Winter Olympics
Ice hockey players at the 1972 Winter Olympics
Sportspeople from Västernorrland County